R. W. Peaden (May 10, 1933 – March 8, 1999) was an American politician. He served as a Democratic member for the 2nd district of the Florida House of Representatives.

Life and career 
Peaden was born in Milton, Florida.

In 1972, Peaden was elected to represent the 2nd district of the Florida House of Representatives, succeeding Gordon Tyrrell. He served until 1976, when he was succeeded by Tom Patterson.

Peaden died in March 1999, at the age of 65.

References 

1933 births
1999 deaths
People from Milton, Florida
Democratic Party members of the Florida House of Representatives
20th-century American politicians